B Zoramthara (born 12 November 1988) is an Indian professional footballer who plays as a midfielder for Aizawl in the I-League.

Career
Born in Mizoram, Zoramthara started his career with Aizawl, participating in various competitions such as the Mizoram Premier League and the I-League 2nd Division. Zoramthara also played with Mizoram in the 2015 National Games of India as the football team earned gold. He made his professional debut for Aizawl in the I-League on 20 February 2016 against Mumbai. He started the match and only played the first half as Aizawl won 2–0.

References

External links 
 ZoFooty Profile.

1987 births
Living people
Indian footballers
Aizawl FC players
Association football midfielders
Footballers from Mizoram
Mizoram Premier League players
I-League 2nd Division players
I-League players